The New South Wales Handball League is a Sydney based championship for Handball run by The New South Wales Handball Association.

Winners

See also

Australian Handball Federation
Handball League Australia

References

External links
 Handball Australia webpage
 New South Wales Handball webpage
 University of Sydney Handball webpage

Handball in Australia
Handball competitions in Australia
Sports club competitions